Arensky Glacier is an Antarctic glacier, lying  east of Alyabiev Glacier and flows south from Beethoven Peninsula, Alexander Island, into the north end of Boccherini Inlet. The glacier was named by the USSR Academy of Sciences in 1987, after Anton Arensky, the Russian composer.

See also
 List of glaciers in the Antarctic
 Glaciology

References

Glaciers of Alexander Island